Sir James Marriott (29 October 1730 – 21 March 1803) was a prominent British judge, politician and scholar of the late eighteenth century who is best known for his service as Judge of the High Court of Admiralty, the highest court in Britain dealing with naval and maritime affairs. Although he presided over a number of important naval cases, his contribution to legal history lies principally in the publication of Formulare instrumentarum, a text on admiralty law that had a significant influence on American law in particular. For the rest of his career, Marriott was a shameless pursuer of political favour, siding with several factions both before and during his service as Member of Parliament for Sudbury between 1780 and 1784 and 1796 and 1802. He was less successful in other areas of his life: he served as a Fellow and subsequently Master at Trinity Hall, Cambridge, but quarrelled with his colleagues and rarely attended the College. He also produced a number of legal pamphlets and poems, which his biography in the Oxford Dictionary of National Biography describes as "slender literary accomplishments".

Life
James Marriott was born on 29 October 1730, the son of attorney Benjamin Marriott and his wife Esther at Twinstead Hall in Essex. In June 1746 he was sent to Trinity Hall, Cambridge, and was elected a scholar in 1747 and graduated LLB in 1751. Although he originally intended a career in the church, he switched to the legal profession in 1755, possibly due to the influence of his stepfather Everard Sayer, a prominent lawyer. He completed an LLD in 1757, having spent the previous three years as librarian to the Duke of Newcastle and having been made a Fellow of Trinity Hall in 1756. He subsequently joined the College of Advocates and began an undistinguished legal career in which he published twice on the issue of neutral's rights.

It was while in the service of Duke of Newcastle that he began his lifelong obsession with patronage, securing the position of Receiver of Land Tax for Suffolk, but otherwise achieving little until the accession of King George III in 1760, when he transferred his allegiance to the King's new ministers, alienating Newcastle in the process. In 1764 he was elected Master of Trinity Hall and in 1767 was made king's advocate, although in both cases the promotion had more to do with a lack of suitable candidates than Marriott's own abilities. In 1767 he served as Vice-Chancellor of the University of Cambridge for a year and in 1768 was prevented from taking up the position of Professor of Modern History by Thomas Gray.

For the next ten years, he relentlessly demanded further promotion, provoking Lord Grafton to fury in the process, but did not receive anything further until 1778 when he was knighted and made the Judge of the High Court of Admiralty, responsible for naval and maritime cases. His service as king's advocate was considered unimpressive, particularly his lack of discretion and courtroom manners and his aggressive speeches against the American colonies and his own colleagues. In 1781 he was elected to Parliament for Sudbury as a supporter of Lord North, making a severe gaffe by seriously suggesting in response to American claims of "no taxation without representation" that the Americans were actually represented by Kent based on the original charters of the Thirteen Colonies. When North resigned, Marriott immediately switched allegiance to Lord Shelburne and the anti-war party, but did not contest his seat at the 1784 election. In 1786 he was again named as Vice-Chancellor of the University of Cambridge, but refused the post on the basis of his legal work. He subsequently sat on several admiralty boards and revised the laws regarding prize money in 1793.

The outbreak of the French Revolutionary Wars in 1793 and the corresponding increase in naval activity greatly strained Marriott's work load, although he produced some notable decisions, particularly in a 1794 case in which Captain Francis Laforey of HMS Carysfort sued the Admiralty over the prize money to be awarded for his capture of the French frigate Castor at the Frigate action of 29 May 1794. In that case, Marriott found in favour of Laforey's claim, setting a precedent in the laws of salvage. He was also re-elected for Sudbury in 1796 after some highly questionable activity: he initially supported the existing MP John Coxe Hippisley, only to withdraw his support at a late stage and announce his own candidacy, causing Hippisley to resign in anger at his behaviour. Marriott remained in Parliament until 1802, shortly before his death.

Marriott resigned from the Admiralty in 1798, to be replaced by Sir William Scott, generally considered to be a much more able man. He returned to Twinstead Hall and remained there until his death on 21 March 1803, having substantially redeveloped the house and rebuilt the local church. The year before he died he created his most important work, Formulare instrumentarum, a text based on his work with admiralty law that had a strong influence on maritime law in the United States. Aside from his final work, he produced a number of poems and legal texts of little distinction, described as describes as "slender literary accomplishments". He never married; his one effort in 1760 ending in refusal by both the girl and her father. Instead, he remained devoted to his mother until her death.

Notes

References

External links
 James Marriott at the Eighteenth-Century Poetry Archive (ECPA)

 
 

1730 births
18th-century English judges
Alumni of Trinity Hall, Cambridge
Masters of Trinity Hall, Cambridge
Knights Bachelor
Members of the Parliament of Great Britain for English constituencies
1803 deaths
British MPs 1780–1784
British MPs 1796–1800
Members of the Parliament of the United Kingdom for English constituencies
UK MPs 1801–1802
Vice-Chancellors of the University of Cambridge
Fellows of Trinity Hall, Cambridge